Boxing at the Friendship Games took place at the Ciudad Deportiva in Havana, Cuba. The boxing schedule began on 18 August and ended on 24 August 1984. Twelve boxing events (all men's individual) were contested.

Notably, Cuba – the host nation – won 11 out of 12 gold medals.

Medal table

Medal table

See also
 Boxing at the 1984 Summer Olympics

References

Friendship Games
Friendship Games
1984 in Cuban sport
Friendship Games
Sport in Havana
International boxing competitions hosted by Cuba